The 2000–01 Toto Cup Artzit was the 2nd time the cup was being contested as a competition for the third tier in the Israeli football league system.

The competition was won by Maccabi Kafr Kanna, who had beaten Maccabi Ashkelon 2–0 in the final.

Format change
For this season, the 12 Liga Artzit clubs were divided into three groups with four clubs in each group. The three group winners, together with the best runner-up advanced to the semi-finals.

Group stage

Group A

Group B

Group C

Semifinals
{| class="wikitable" style="text-align: center"
|-
!Home Team
!Score
!Away Team
|-

Final

See also
 Toto Cup
 2000–01 Liga Artzit

References

External links
 Israel Cup 2000/01 RSSSF 

Toto Cup Artzit
Toto Cup Artzit
Israel Toto Cup Artzit